Immacolata Concezione ("Immaculate Conception", Italian: Chiesa dell'Immacolata), also called the Convent of the Cappuccini, is a Roman Catholic church located on Piazza Umberto I in the town of Riccia, Province of Campobasso in the region of Molise, Italy.

History
In 1679, the church and convent of the Capuchins was erected upon the ruins of the former Convent of the Celestine Order.

The austere stone facade, rusticated inferiorly, has bronze doors; the lunettes above have a relief depicting the Immaculate Conception and Jesus by the sculptor Ettore Marinelli. On the roof of the main entrance is a much restored fresco of St Francis of Assisi receiving the Stigmata (1696) by an unknown painter. The church also has a painting of the Immaculate Conception with the Holy Spirit and St Joseph and Saints (1685) by Benedetto Brunetti.

References

Roman Catholic churches in Riccia
17th-century Roman Catholic church buildings in Italy
Roman Catholic churches completed in 1679
1679 establishments in Italy